François Georges René Bruhat (8 April 1929 – 17 July 2007) was a French mathematician who worked on algebraic groups.   The Bruhat order of a Weyl group, the Bruhat decomposition, and the Schwartz–Bruhat functions are named after him.

He was the son of physicist (and associate director of the École Normale Supérieure during the occupation) Georges Bruhat, and brother of physicist Yvonne Choquet-Bruhat.

See also
Hadamard space

References

1929 births
2007 deaths
École Normale Supérieure alumni
Members of the French Academy of Sciences
Nicolas Bourbaki
20th-century French mathematicians
21st-century French mathematicians